The Rail Delivery Group (RDG), previously the Association of Train Operating Companies, is the British rail industry membership body that brings together passenger and freight rail companies, Network Rail and High Speed 2.

History
From 24 October 2017, RDG replaced:
 The Association of Train Operating Companies (ATOC), comprising the passenger train operating companies. ATOC was set up by the train operators to ensure nationwide services – such as ticket acceptance and railcards – continued after the privatisation of the railways under the Railways Act 1993. ATOC also lobbied on the operators' behalf.
 The former Rail Delivery Group, formed in 2011 to formulate policy and undertake communications on behalf of the entire rail industry. At first the group's members were the major passenger and freight train operator groups, together with Network Rail; membership was widened to all passenger and freight operators in 2013.

The new RDG is owned by its members, which are:
 Network Rail, the nationalised owner of the rail infrastructure
The train operating companies that provide passenger services
The freight operating companies
The Rail Supply Group (RSG), representing the rail supply industry
HS2 Ltd, the company building a high-speed line

The current RDG owns both the National Rail and 'Britain Runs on Rail' brands. The company's legal name continues to be ATOC Limited.

Main operations
 Revenue allocation and settlement through ORCATS systems
 National Rail Enquiries 
 Railcard marketing 
 Staff travel arrangements for current and retired railway staff 
 International products, such as Britrail and Interrail
 The relationship with Transport for London 
 The licensing of third party ticket sellers, such as travel agents and online sellers such as The Trainline and Red Spotted Hanky
 Sponsorship of the Plusbus and Cycle-Rail schemes
 Railway policy formulation
 Industry communications with the public
It also produces the definitive National Routeing Guide, defining the validity of tickets, and has some input in the content of the National Fares Manual, which is distributed by the National Rail website. It works with RSG to coordinate shared objectives.

European equivalents
As rail franchising also takes place in other countries, most European countries have one or more equivalent organisations.

In Germany, the Tarifverband der Bundeseigenen und Nichtbundeseigenen Eisenbahnen in Deutschland (Tariff Association of Federal and Non-Federal Railways in Germany; TBNE) is responsible for railway ticket revenue distribution. Political representation of established companies is carried out by the Verband Deutscher Verkehrsunternehmen (VDV), whereas public relations of new entrant TOCs are chiefly dealt with by mofair e.V.

In Spain the Asociación Española de Empresas Ferroviarias de Viajeros (Spanish Association of Passenger Rail Companies) represents the sector, and aims to contribute to changes and regulatory improvement and support and defend the rail transport mode.

In Sweden, the equivalent organisation is the Branschföreningen Tågoperatörerna (Association of Swedish Train Operating Companies).

See also 
Connecting Communities
List of companies operating trains in the United Kingdom

References

External links 

 

British companies established in 1993
Business organisations based in the United Kingdom
Railway companies of the United Kingdom
Railway associations
Organisations based in the City of London
Transport organisations based in the United Kingdom
1993 establishments in the United Kingdom